Earl L. Stoltenow (February 10, 1924 – October 23, 2017) was an American politician who was a member of the North Dakota House of Representatives. He represented the 25th district from 1967 to 1974 as a member of the Republican party. An alumnus of the University of North Dakota, he was a farmer.

References

1924 births
2017 deaths
Members of the North Dakota House of Representatives